Rod Sarich (born March 23, 1981) is a Canadian-British professional ice hockey defenceman

Career
Before turning professional, Sarich played junior hockey in the Western Hockey League for the Calgary Hitmen. He was drafted 109th overall by the Florida Panthers in the 1999 NHL Entry Draft but played in the NHL. Sarich began his professional career in 2002 with the Louisiana IceGators of the East Coast Hockey League. The following season, he moves to Finland and signed for the Espoo Blues of the SM-liiga, but after just twenty games and one assist, he was released from the team and he returned to the IceGators to close the 2003-04 season.

He then played for the Augusta Lynx before signing for the Sheffield Steelers of the Elite Ice Hockey League in the United Kingdom in 2005. Sarich would spend the rest of his career with the Steelers, playing eleven seasons with the team where he won four Elite League titles and three playoff titles. He retired in 2017.

International play
Although Canadian by birth, Sarich opted to play for Great Britain and made his debut in February 2013 during the Olympic qualifiers.

Personal life
Sarich is the younger brother of Cory Sarich and the brother-in-law of Nick Schultz.

References

External links

1981 births
Living people
Augusta Lynx players
British ice hockey defencemen
Calgary Hitmen players
Canadian ice hockey defencemen
Espoo Blues players
Florida Panthers draft picks
Ice hockey people from Saskatchewan
Louisiana IceGators (ECHL) players
Sheffield Steelers players
Canadian expatriate ice hockey players in England
Canadian expatriate ice hockey players in the United States
Canadian expatriate ice hockey players in Finland
Naturalised citizens of the United Kingdom
Naturalised sports competitors